Dianna Lynn Batts (born November 30, 1944) is an American former model and actress.

From 1975 to 1993, Parkinson served as a model on The Price Is Right.

Career history
In 1965, while living in Falls Church, Virginia, Parkinson won the Miss District of Columbia USA title and competed as Diana Batts in the Miss USA 1965 pageant, where she placed fourth runner-up. Parkinson won the 1965 Miss USA World contest. She went on to represent the United States in the international Miss World 1965 contest, and was first runner-up to Lesley Langley of the United Kingdom.

Parkinson traveled during 1965 with the Bob Hope USO Show, including performances in Vietnam during late December 1965, and also served as Queen of the 1965 Bob Hope Desert Classic golf tournament.

In 1975, Parkinson was a guest star on The Mary Tyler Moore Show ("Ted's Moment of Glory").

In 1978, Parkinson appeared in the pilot of the TV series Vega$.

From 1975 to 1993, Parkinson was a model on the US television game show The Price Is Right. Her 18-year tenure on the show was among the longest of any of the models, second only to Janice Pennington, who was with the show for more than 28 years.

Departure from The Price Is Right
Parkinson left the show in 1993, supposedly to "pursue other interests", as host Bob Barker announced during her final taping, which aired on June 18, 1993.

In 1994, Parkinson filed a lawsuit in Los Angeles Superior Court (case no. BC106366) against Barker for sexual harassment, claiming a three-year sexual relationship was extorted by threats of firing from The Price Is Right. Barker denied the sexual harassment allegations. The suit was withdrawn in April 1995, with Parkinson claiming it was too costly and had taken a toll on her health.

Playboy
Parkinson was the cover girl of Playboy in December 1991 and again in May 1993.  In 1993, Parkinson was featured exclusively in a Playboy "Newsstand Edition" photo magazine entitled Playboy Presents, Dian Parkinson. Also in 1993, the video Playboy Celebrity Centerfold: Dian Parkinson was released.

EZ Krunch
In 1993, Parkinson was the official spokesperson for the home exercise equipment machine EZ Krunch.

Space Ghost: Coast to Coast
In 1994, Parkinson appeared as a guest on the animated talk show Space Ghost: Coast to Coast ("Punch").

Personal life 
In November 2019, Parkinson listed a residence in Westlake Village, California.

References

External links
 
 Court TV article with information on Dian Parkison's suit

1944 births
Living people
1990s Playboy Playmates
Miss World 1965 delegates
Miss USA 1960s delegates
Game show models
People from Jacksonville, North Carolina
20th-century American people
United Service Organizations entertainers